The Geneva Centre of Humanitarian Studies (formerly known as CERAH) offers comprehensive and specialized postgraduate training programmes for professionals active in the humanitarian sector. It is a joint centre of the University of Geneva and the Graduate Institute of International and Development Studies It is one of the few institutes dedicated to the study of humanitarian action.

History 

Between the 1970s and 1980s, some of the larger humanitarian organisations based in Geneva started offering operational training for humanitarians. A decade later, the need to' professionalise' the sector became evident in the aftermath of the Rwanda genocide, the Balkans war, and the ensuing mass mobilisation of new humanitarian actors.

1998 – Back then, there were no academic courses on humanitarian action, but thanks to the University of Geneva, several international organisations and the Swiss Ministry of Foreign Affairs, a Plurifaculty Programme for Humanitarian Action – PPAH, was born.  The Plurifaculty Programme for Humanitarian Action was the first iteration of the Geneva Centre of Humanitarian Studies. The objective of this visionary programme was to offer high-level, continuous education for humanitarian practitioners.    

2004 – The programme was radically transformed under the impulse of the University of Geneva and the Graduate Institute of International and Development Studies (IHEID) and re-named PIAH – Interdisciplinary Programme in Humanitarian Action. PIAH offered a wider course programme, including a Master of Advanced Studies in Humanitarian Action, in partnership with the International Committee of the Red Cross and Médecins Sans Frontières Switzerland.

2008 – The partnership between the University of Geneva and the IHEID changed the programme’s name into CERAH – Centre for Education and Research in Humanitarian Action. In 2012, the Centre expanded its course offer by adding to the Master DAS, CAS and Executive Short Courses. In 2017, the Centre launched its Humanitarian Encyclopedia research project, and in 2018 it celebrated its 20th anniversary.

2020 – The Centre evolved further and became the Geneva Centre of Humanitarian Studies.

Degree and Training Programmes

Master of Advanced Studies in Humanitarian Action (MAS) 

The MAS in Humanitarian Action is a 10- to 12-month full-time programme of 60 European Credit Transfer System (ECTS) credits. The programme is focused on building in-depth understanding of the central conceptual and operational aspects of humanitarian action. Since 2012, the MAS in Humanitarian Action is offered to international managers in the humanitarian and development sector (with at least 2 years of working experience and holding a higher education institution degree), who wish to deepen their competencies in specific areas and add an academic and analytical dimension to their professional skills. This programme was awarded unconditional accreditation by the Swiss Center of Accreditation and Quality Assurance in Higher Education (AAQ).

Other Courses 
The Centre offers a wide range of Executive Short Courses on specific topics linked to humanitarian action, including negotiation, advocacy, planetary health, protection and more.
The majority of the short courses are delivered online. In addition, the Centre offers a few residential courses either in Geneva or other locations.

The Diploma of Advanced Studies (DAS) aims to offer professionals a critical understanding of the humanitarian system and response learning from history and various other disciplines and an ability to contextualise humanitarian action in today’s world. It explores the role of humanitarianism in how the world is governed today and the political economy at play in relationships between States, non-State actors, international organisations, international and local non-governmental organisations and affected populations. Finally, the programme addresses the postcolonial dynamics of past and present humanitarian interventions to identify new avenues for contemporary and future crises.

The Certificate of Advanced Studies in Quality Management of Humanitarian Projects addresses the dynamics and components that guarantee the quality management of adapted projects and cohesive teams. It integrates fundamental principles such as inclusion and diversity, do no harm, accountability and participation into processes, methods and tools of project and people management. The course benefits from guest lecturers from various partner organisations, including MSF, SPHERE, HQAI, CHS Alliance and Terre des Hommes.

References 

 

Schools in Geneva
Humanities education
Graduate Institute of International and Development Studies
University of Geneva
Educational organisations based in Switzerland
Educational institutions established in 1998
1998 establishments in Switzerland